The Devil's Bondwoman is a 1916 American silent Melodrama directed by Lloyd B. Carleton. The film was based on the story by F. McGrew Willis and scenarized by Maie B. Havey and Fred Myton. The movie features Dorothy Davenport and Emory Johnson and employed the same cast seen in other Red Feather films, e.g., Barriers of Society, Black Friday.

The film has an allegorical prologue taking place in Hell and an epilogue. Wealthy banker Mason Van Horton becomes involved with socialite Doria Manners, who is married to businessman John Manners. When Mason falls in Love with another woman named Beverly Hope, he tries to end the affair with Doria. A revengeful Doria tells her husband Mason tried to seduce her and wants John to ruin Van Horton financially. An incensed John Manners arranges for one of Mason's central banks to go bankrupt but discovers his wife making Love to Prince Vandloup. John instantly realizes Doria lied about Mason while having an affair with the prince. John Manners leaves her, and Prince Vandloup changes into the Devil and carts Doria away.

The movie was released by Universal on November 20, 1916.

Plot
The film's prologue transports the moviegoers to the grottoes of Hell. Life's Creator has gathered the underworld spirits to help him create a mortal. They work non-stop and complete their creation. While the spirits admire their work, the Devil enters. Examining the Creator's mortal, Satan determines one attribute is missing. He instills the mortal with the Love of Self. The Devil knows pride is the most sinister of the Seven Deadly sins, and all other immoralities spring forth from the sin of pride.

Satan has added his last touches to the mortal and feels the "Man" is ready to navigate the road of life. The Devil chooses the easiest path for the man and sends him forth into the world. Satan returns to Hell, discovering the spirits have created another mortal. Satan declares this mortal a "Woman." The Devil adds no other attributes to the woman and sends her to follow life's pathways. Satan knows the man will take care of her downward spiral. Maniacal laughter fills the cavern–Satan knows he has done well.

Mason Van Horton is the young president of Van Horton bank, a self-made millionaire, and a ranking member of society. The bank is in an impoverished section of town. Hundreds of workers have placed their hard-earned life savings in the bank. Mason has taken a carefree approach toward the bank, and it is on the precipice of failure.
The elder John Manners is wealthy and married to his wife, Doria. She is a social vampire who seeks to raise her social standing. John Manners has assisted Mason in his ascent to the top of his business. However, he is not above taking advantage of Mason's missteps whenever they present themselves.

Doria tires of her husband's company and focuses her flirtatious talents on Mason Van Horton. She flirts and entices Mason, and he does not resist her overtures.
Beverly Hope visits her aunt, Barbara. Mason meets Beverly at a social function and falls in Love. Beverly is so sweet and virtuous that Mason reflects upon his past life. Could he have done anything differently so he could ask her to marry him?

There is a gala at the Manners' home. They have invited all the social elites. During the party, Doria snuggles up to Mason and asks him to meet her privately. Mason agrees, and after all the guests have gone, he sneaks upstairs to Doria's apartment. She is sitting on a divan, waiting for his arrival. Mason enters the room, sits on the sofa, and they embrace. He pulls back after a brief sigh and then leans forward to kiss Doria. Mason takes one last glance at Doria as their lips are about to meet. The room seems to darken around them, and he can only see the face of his beloved Beverly. He reels back in fear and stumbles to his feet. Mason rushes from the room while every fiber of his body is writhing in guilt. After all, he almost betrayed the woman he loved, but the thought of Beverly broke Doria's spell. As he leaves the room, he passes a curious John Manners.

Doria is beside herself when she cannot win the affection of Mason Van Horton. Mason's rejection of Doria triggers a vengeance response. She tells her husband; Mason had forced his way into her room and tried to have his way. An enraged Manners wants to kill Van Horton. Doria pleads with her husband not to harm him but to ruin him financially. With Manner's business acumen, it doesn't take long for him to bankrupt Van Horton's bank. The bank's investors lose every penny of their savings. Mason holds himself responsible for the failure of his bank. He commits to making total restitution. He sacrifices his entire fortune to repay the poor people that invested in his bank. 
While all the other intrigues occur, Beverly falls in Love with Mason. Beverly has agreed to marry Mason and help him work his way through his plans for restitution.

Doria throws a reception at her house and invites Mason. He accepts, hoping he can find some private time with John Manners. The reception is in full swing when a strange woman shows up. She was a former Van Horton failed bank member and had lost her life savings. Doria discovers her background and orders her from the house. Instead of leaving, the woman slips upstairs to Doria's room. Once in the room, she stabs herself and falls, bleeding to the floor. 
At the reception, the dinner guests gather around a table. Doria is entertaining the guests when a drop of blood falls from the ceiling. The shaken dinner guests are astonished. During the confusion in the other room, Mason and John Manners are in the library discussing business when a guest hurries in and tells them about the drops of blood.
John Manners rushes upstairs to see what happened. After assessing the situation, he returns to the library. Passing one of the upstairs rooms, he hears Doria and Prince Vandloup making Love. He enters the room, confronts the two, and condemns Doria. John Manners now recognizes how Doria had manipulated him. Manners heads downstairs and explains to his bewildered guests that Doria was behind the collapse of the Van Horton bank. Under the circumstances, Manners will help Mason make restitution. He expels Doria from the house and banishes her forever.

Mason and Beverly profess their Love for each other and get married. Doria has always had an infatuation with Prince Vandloup. The prince made Love to her at every opportunity. Because Doria failed to seduce Mason, she must now pay the Devil his due. Prince Vandloup transforms into the Devil, and Doria learns she is in the power of evil and forever the Devil's Bondwoman.

Cast
{|
! style="width: 180px; text-align: left;" |  Actor
! style="width: 230px; text-align: left;" |  Role
|- style="text-align: left;"
|Dorothy Davenport||Beverly Hope
|-
|Emory Johnson||Mason Van Horton
|-
|Adele Farrington||Doria Manners
|-
|William Canfield||John Manners
|-
|Arthur Hoyt||The Alchemist
|-
|Richard Morris||Prince Vandloup
|-
|C. Norman Hammond||The Spirit of Fire
|-
|Miriam Shelby||Aunt Barbara
|-
|}

Development
According to the book - The Universal Story, Carl Laemmle (-1939) produced around 91 movies in 1916.
Lloyd B. Carleton (–1933) started working for Carl Laemmle in the Fall of 1915. Carleton arrived with impeccable credentials, having directed some 60 films for the likes of Thanhouser, Lubin, Fox, and Selig. 
Between March and December 1916, 44-year-old Lloyd Carleton directed 16 movies for Universal, starting with The Yaqui and ending with The Morals of Hilda. Emory Johnson acted in all 16 of these films. Of Carleton's 1916 output, 11 were feature films, and the rest were two-reel shorts.

In 1916, Carleton directed all 13 films pairing Dorothy Davenport and Emory Johnson. This film would be the last in the 13-film series. These totals show Carl Laemmle was giving the Davenport-Johnson pairing one of his elite directors from the working cadre of universal directors to produce the screen chemistry Laemmle was seeking.
After completing this film, Carleton would make The Morals of Hilda and sever his connections with Universal.

Casting
Dorothy Davenport (1895-1977) was an established star for Universal when the  year-old actress played Beverly Hope. She had acted in hundreds of movies by the time she starred in this film. Most of these films were 2-reel shorts, as was the norm in Hollywood's teen years. She had been making movies since 1910. She started dating Wally Reid when she was barely 16, and he was 20. They married in 1913. After her husband died in 1923, she used the name "Mrs. Wallace Reid" in the credits for any project she took part in. Besides being an actress, she would eventually become a film director, producer, and writer.

Emory Johnson (1894-1960) was  years old when he acted in this movie as Mason Van Horton. In January 1916, Emory signed a contract with Universal Film Manufacturing Company. Carl Laemmle of Universal Film Manufacturing Company thought he saw great potential in Johnson, so he chose him to be Universal's new leading man. Laemmle hoped Johnson would become another Wallace Reed. A significant part of his plan was to create a movie couple that would sizzle on the silver screen. Laemmle thought Dorothy Davenport and Emory Johnson could make the chemistry he sought. Johnson and Davenport would complete 13 films together. They started with the successful feature production of Doctor Neighbor in May 1916 and ended with The Devil's Bondwoman in November 1916. After completing the last movie, Laemmle thought Johnson did not have the screen presence he wanted. He decided not to renew his contract. Johnson would make 17 movies in 1916, including six shorts and 11 feature-length Dramas. 1916 would become the second-highest movie output of his entire acting career. Emory acted in 25 films for Universal, mostly dramas with a sprinkling of comedies and westerns.

Richard Morris (1862-1924) was a  year-old actor when he played Prince Vandloup. He was a character actor and former opera singer known for Granny (1913). He would eventually participate in many Johnson projects, including  |In the Name of the Law (1922),  The Third Alarm (1922),  The West~Bound Limited (1923), The Mailman (1923), The Spirit of the USA (1924) until his untimely death in 1924.

Adele Farrington (Mrs. Hobart Bosworth) (-1936) was  years old when she portrayed Doria Manners. She was also a Universal contract player appearing in 74 films between 1914 and 1926. Although she got her start in movies when she was 47 years old (1914), Universal cast her mostly in character leads. Many of her roles were acting alongside her husband, Hobart Bosworth, who married in 1909 and divorced in 1920. In addition to her role as an actress, she was also a music composer and writer.

Arthur Hoyt (1874-1953) was  years old when he portrayed the Alchemist. He was an American film  character actor who appeared in more than 275 films. He started seriously acting in 1916 and continued getting parts until 1947.

Screenplay
This film was written by F. McGrew Willis (1891-1957) and Walter Woods (1881-1942). They often combined their name into "Willis Woods"; thus, the credit for the story would be given to - "Willis Wood."

The names of scenarist Maie B. Havey and author Willis Woods are scratched out in the film's original copyright entry. The office replaced the entry with the names of "Willis Woods" as the author and "Fred Myton" as the scenarist. They agreed, and "Fred Myton" was credited as the prologue writer.

Filming
The interiors were filmed in the studio complex at Universal Studios located at 100 Universal City Plaza in  Universal City, California.

Alternate title
During the film's development, the title was listed as - The Devil's Die. This movie had another alternate title The Devil's Bondswoman.

Music
As part of Universal's in-house publication, The Moving Picture Weekly, a section was devoted to proposing musical selections for specific Universal movies. The musical selections were "Specially Selected and Compiled by M. Winkler." 
Each reel of the movie had recommendations, as shown below:
 The Devil's Bondwoman 
 REEL I
 I. "Olympia," by Ascher, until "And then was brought forth," etc. 
 2. "Creepy Creep," by Tyler, until "Mason Van Horton," etc. 
 3. "Extase," by Ganne, until "Scene: Dancing." 
 4. "Harlequin One-Step," by Roberts, until "Scene: Interior of office." 
 5. "Alia Ballerina Valse Lenton." 
The complete music recommendations for this film are located in the Gallery section of this page.

Advertising
This film carried Universal's "Red Feather" brand, designating a low-budget feature film.

Universal's trade journal, The Moving Picture Weekly, contains an advertising section titled - PUTTING IT OVER. The team would give exhibitors suggestions for advertising selected movies. November 11, 1916, issue had the following advertising suggestions for this movie:

{{blockquote|THE RED FEATHER for November 20 is called "The Devil's Bondwoman." Mephisto costumes are easy to obtain. It would be very effective to have a regular operatic Mephistopheles in red clothes, a short cape, pointed shoes, and a cap with a standing feather, dragging a handsomely dressed woman chained by the wrists to him. This could be used as a lobby tableau vivant or posed on the stage in front of your screen while the lights in the house are up, with appropriate placards giving the release date.}}

Reviews
The magazine movie critics generally panned this movie.
In the November 25, 1916 issue of the Motion Picture News, Peter Milne writes:

In the November 22, 1916 issue of The New York Clipper'', the staff critic opines:

Preservation status
According to the Library of Congress website, this film has a current status of  "No holdings located in archives," thus it is presumed all copies of this film are lost.

Gallery

References

External links

 
 
List of Universal Pictures films (1912–1919)
Universal Pictures
List of American films of 1916

1916 lost films
1916 drama films
1916 films
American black-and-white films
American silent feature films
Associated Exhibitors films
Lost American films
Lost drama films
Melodrama films
Universal Pictures films
Films directed by Lloyd B. Carleton
1910s English-language films
1910s American films
Silent American drama films